Amber-Jade Sanderson (born 25 October 1976) is an Australian Labor Party politician who is the member for Morley in the Western Australian Legislative Assembly, the lower house of the Parliament of Western Australia. Since 21 December 2021, she has been Minister for Health and Minister for Mental health. From 19 March 2021 to 21 December 2021, she was Minister for Environment, Minister for Climate Action and Minister for Commerce. She rose to prominence when she chaired the Joint Select Committee on End of Life Choices. From 22 May 2013 to 5 February 2017, she was a member of the Western Australian Legislative Council, the upper house of the Parliament of Western Australia, for the East Metropolitan Region.

Early life and career
Amber-Jade Sanderson was born on 25 October 1976 in Mascot, New South Wales, a suburb of Sydney. Her parents were Ten Pound Poms who had immigrated from England to Perth as teenagers during the 1970s. She spent her early childhood in Bayswater, Western Australia, a suburb of Perth. When she was about five years old, her parents separated. She moved to London with her mother in 1986, and started living in England for the most part over the following 14 years. She attended eight or nine different schools in total, including St Columba's School, Bayswater Primary School and John Forrest Secondary College in Morley.

At Cardiff University, Sanderson studied journalism with a focus on politics. She then worked in public affairs in London. In 2001, she moved back to Perth and started working as a media advisor for the federal member for Fremantle, Carmen Lawrence. Sanderson's parents and siblings moved to Perth a couple of years later. For about ten years, Sanderson worked for the Liquor, Hospitality and Miscellaneous Union (renamed in 2011 to United Voice), rising as far as assistant state secretary.

Political career
Soon after becoming assistant secretary of United Voice, Sanderson was preselected by the Labor Party as the third candidate on their ticket for the East Metropolitan Region of the Western Australian Legislative Council, the upper house of the Parliament of Western Australia. She was elected at the 2013 state election, with her term commencing on 22 May 2013.

From 16 October 2013 to 5 February 2017, Sanderson was deputy chair of committees.

On 5 February 2017, Sanderson resigned from the Legislative Assembly in order to run for the Western Australian Legislative Assembly (lower house) seat of Morley. The seat was traditionally a Labor seat, but it had been won at the previous two elections by Liberal MP Ian Britza. She was elected to that seat at the 2017 election with 61.4% of the two-party-preferred vote and a 16.2% two-party-preferred swing.

From 17 March 2017 to 19 March 2021, Sanderson was the parliamentary secretary to Mark McGowan, who was the premier, minister for public sector management, minister for state development, jobs and trade, and minister for federal-state relations, as well as parliamentary secretary of the cabinet.

In August 2017, Sanderson moved a motion for the establishment of the Joint Select Committee on End of Life Choices, with the purpose of reporting on the "need for laws in Western Australia to allow citizens to make informed decisions regarding their own end of life choices". The motion passed, and so from 23 August 2017 to 23 August 2018, she was on that committee, including as chair from 4 September 2017. This committee presented the "My Life, My Choice" report in August 2018, recommending voluntary assisted dying be allowed when "grievous and irremediable suffering related to an advanced and progressive terminal, chronic or neurodegenerative condition [...] where death is a reasonably foreseeable outcome of the condition". Parliament later passed voluntary assisted dying into law, and Sanderson's role in this gained her prominence and speculation that she would one day become the minister for health or premier.

At the 2021 state election on 13 March 2021, Sanderson was re-elected as the member for Morley, with a two-party-preferred vote of 78.6% and a two-party-preferred swing of 16.2%. Five days later, she joined the Western Australian cabinet when she was appointed as Minister for Commerce, Minister for Environment and the newly created position of Minister for Climate Action. She relinquished those ministries when, on 21 December 2021, Sanderson became the minister for health and mental health, replacing Roger Cook. Reece Whitby succeeded Sanderson as Minister for Environment and Minister for Climate Action, and Roger Cook succeeded her as Minister for Commerce.

In response to the United States overturning Roe v. Wade in June 2022, Sanderson stated that Western Australia's abortion laws were "outdated" and "probably not a model that’s fit for purpose now", but did not commit to changing them. At the time, women seeking an abortion after 20 weeks had to see an ethics panel consisting of six medical practitioners, two of whom must agree that either the mother or fetus has a severe medical condition that justifies the procedure. This caused many women to travel interstate to get an abortion. Other issues included that there were only two abortion service providers in the state and the high cost of the procedure.

Personal life
Sanderson lives with her partner Phillip in Bayswater. She has two children: her first child was with her previous husband whom she divorced during her first term in parliament; her second child was with her current partner.

References

1976 births
Living people
Australian Labor Party members of the Parliament of Western Australia
Australian people of English descent
Australian trade unionists
Alumni of Cardiff University
Members of the Western Australian Legislative Council
Members of the Western Australian Legislative Assembly
Politicians from Perth, Western Australia
21st-century Australian politicians
21st-century Australian women politicians
Women members of the Western Australian Legislative Assembly
Women members of the Western Australian Legislative Council